This list of climate scientists contains famous or otherwise notable persons who have contributed to the study of climate science. The list is compiled manually, so will not be complete, up to date, or comprehensive. See also :Category:Climatologists. 
The list includes scientists from several specialities or disciplines.

A 
Waleed Abdalati, American, director of Cooperative Institute for Research in Environmental Studies, former chief scientist of NASA
Nerilie Abram (1977-), Australian paleoclimatologist, at Australian National University
 Ernest Afiesimama, Nigerian weatherman, former senior associate of the International Centre for Theoretical Physics 
 Myles Allen, head of the Climate Dynamics group at University of Oxford's Atmospheric, Oceanic and Planetary Physics Department.  Lead author, IPCC Third Assessment Report.  Review editor, Fourth Assessment Report.
Richard Alley (1957-), Penn State College of Earth and Mineral Science, American, Earth's cryosphere and global climate change.
 Kevin Anderson, Director of the Tyndall Centre for Climate Change Research and is an adviser to the British Government on climate change.
James Annan, British climatologist with Blue Skies Research, UK
Julie Arblaster, Australian climatologist at The Centre for Australian Weather and Climate Research in CSIRO
David Archer, American professor of oceanography at University of Chicago
Svante Arrhenius (1859-1927), Swedish, greenhouse effect

B 
Sallie Baliunas, American, astrophysicist, solar variation
Elizabeth A. Barnes, American climate scientist working on earth science statistics
Eric J. Barron (1944-), American geophysicist, President of Pennsylvania State University
Roger G. Barry, (1935-2018), British-American, polar climatologist, first director of the National Snow and Ice Data Center
Robin Bell, American, polar geophysicist, President-elect of the American Geophysical Union
Martin Beniston, Swiss climate scientist. 
Lennart Bengtsson (1935-), Swedish meteorologist and climate scientist
André Berger, (1942-), Belgian, modeling climatic changes at the geological and at the century time scales
Richard A. Betts, Head of the Climate Impacts strategic area at the Met Office Hadley Centre
John W. Birks, American atmospheric chemist and co-developer of the nuclear winter theory
Jacob Bjerknes (1897-1975), Norwegian-American meteorologist
Vilhelm Bjerknes (1862-1951), Norwegian, forecasting, numerical models
Bert Bolin (1925-2007), Swedish meteorologist, first chair of the IPCC
Gerard C. Bond (1940-2005), American geologist and paleoclimate researcher
Jason Box, American professor of glaciology at Ohio State University
Raymond S. Bradley, American, historical temperatures, paleoclimatology, and climate variability.
Keith Briffa (1952-2017), United Kingdom, dendrochronology, temperature history.
Wallace Smith Broecker (1931-2019), American, Pleistocene geochronology, radiocarbon dating, and chemical oceanography
Harold E. Brooks (1959-), American meteorologist, severe convective storm and tornado climatology as well as conducive atmospheric environments
Keith Browning, British meteorologist; mesoscale meteorology, sparkles

C 
Robert Cahalan, American, climate physics, energy balance, radiative transfer, remote sensing, solar radiation
Ken Caldeira, American, climate engineering, ocean acidification, atmospheric chemistry
 Guy Stewart Callendar, English,(February 1898-October 1964), steam engineer and inventor who proposed what eventually became known as the Callendar effect, the theory that linked rising carbon dioxide concentrations in the atmosphere to global temperature
Mark Cane, American, modeling and prediction of the El Niño-Southern Oscillation
Anny Cazenave, French oceanographer specializing in satellite altimetry
Robert D. Cess, American atmospheric scientist, emeritus professor at Stony Brook University
Jule G. Charney (1917-1981), American meteorologist, pioneer in numerical weather modeling
John Christy, director of the Earth System Science Center at The University of Alabama in Huntsville. Best known (with Roy Spencer) for developing the first version of the satellite temperature record.
John A. Church (1951-), Australian oceanographer, chair of the World Climate Research Programme
Ralph J. Cicerone (1943-2016), American atmospheric chemist, President of U.S. National Academy of Sciences
Danielle Claar, American marine scientist studying effect of climate on coral symbionts and parasites
Allison Crimmins, American, head of the National Climate Assessment
Harmon Craig (1926-2003), pioneering American geochemist
Paul J. Crutzen (1933-2021), Dutch, stratospheric and tropospheric chemistry, and their role in the biogeochemical cycles and climate
Heidi Cullen, American meteorologist, chief scientist for Climate Central
Balfour Currie OC (1902-1981), Canadian climatologist at University of Saskatchewan
Judith Curry American climatologist and former chair of the School of Earth and Atmospheric Sciences at the Georgia Institute of Technology

D 
Willi Dansgaard (1922-2011), Danish climatologist
Scott Denning, American atmospheric scientist and professor at Colorado State University
Andrew Dessler, American atmospheric scientist and professor at Texas A&M University
P. C. S. Devara, Indian climatologist and professor at Amity University, Gurgaon
Robert E. Dickinson. American climatologist, professor at University of Texas at Austin
Mark Dyurgerov (died 2009), Russian-American glaciologist

E 
Sylvia Earle (1935-), American marine biologist
Don Easterbrook (1935-), American, Professor Emeritus of Geology at Western Washington University
Tamsin Edwards, British climate scientist at King's College London
Arnt Eliassen, dynamic meteorologist
Kerry Emanuel (1955-), American, atmospheric dynamics specializing in hurricanes
Matthew England (1966-), Australian, physical oceanographer and climate dynamicist
Ian G. Enting, Australian mathematical physicist at University of Melbourne

F 
Joe Farman, British, ozone hole above Antarctica
Christopher Field, American climate scientist with the Carnegie Institution for Science
Eunice Newton Foote (1819-1888), American scientist, first to demonstrate that increased atmospheric levels of CO2 would result in heating of the atmosphere
Piers Forster, British professor of Physical Climate Change at University of Leeds
Joseph Fourier (1768-1830), French, greenhouse effect
Jennifer Francis, climate change in the Arctic
Benjamin Franklin (1706-1790), first mapped the course of the Gulf Stream for use in sending mail from the United States to Europe
Chris Freeman, Welsh professor of biogeochemistry
Eigil Friis-Christensen (1944-2018), Danish geophysicist
Inez Fung, American, climate modeling, biogeochemical cycles, and climate change
Yevgraf Yevgrafovich Fyodorov (1880-1965), Russian climatologist

G 
 Francis Galton (1822-1911), coined the term anticyclone
 Filippo Giorgi (1959-), Italian atmospheric physicist, International Centre for Theoretical Physics
 Peter Gleick (1956-), American, hydroclimatologist, hydrologic impacts of climate change, snowfall/snowmelt responses, water adaptation strategies, consequences of sea level rise
 Kenneth M. Golden, American applied mathematician, percolation theory and diffusion process models of sea ice, professor at University of Utah
 Natalya Gomez, climate-ice sheet-solid earth modeler, Canadian, professor at McGill University
 Jonathan M. Gregory, climate modeler, British, professor at University of Reading
 Jean Grove (1927-2001), British, glaciologist; the Little Ice Age

H 
 Joanna Haigh, (1954-), British, Co-Director of Grantham Institute at Imperial College London, solar variability
 Edmund Halley, published a map of the trade winds in 1686 after a voyage to the southern hemisphere
Gordon Hamilton, (1966-2016), Scottish, Associate Research Professor, Climatology Group, of the University of Maine
James E. Hansen (1941-), American, planetary atmospheres, remote sensing, numerical models, and global warming
Kenneth Hare OC FRSC (1919-2002), Canadian climatologist
Klaus Hasselmann, German oceanographer and climate modeller, founding director of the Max Planck Institute for Meteorology
Ed Hawkins, British climate scientist at University of Reading, and designer of data visualization graphics
Katharine Hayhoe, Canadian, Atmospheric science, global climate models.
Gabriele C. Hegerl (1963-), Professor of Climate System Science at the University of Edinburgh School of GeoSciences.
Isaac Held, German-American atmospheric physicist, researcher at GFDL
Ann Henderson-Sellers (1952-),  Australian, climate change risk evaluation
Ellie Highwood, Professor of Climate Physics at the University of Reading
David A. Hodell, (1958-), British paleoclimatologist, professor at Cambridge University
Ove Hoegh-Guldberg, Australian oceanographer at University of Queensland
Greg Holland, Australian meteorology researcher at NCAR
Brian Hoskins, British climatologist and professor at University of Reading
John T. Houghton (1931-2020), British, atmospheric physics, remote sensing
Malcolm K. Hughes, British meso-climatologist, professor at University of Arizona
Mike Hulme (1960-), British, climate impacts, climate modelling, climate and culture.
Thomas Sterry Hunt (1826-1892), American, first scientist to connect carbon dioxide to climate change

I 
Sherwood Idso (1942-), American, former research physicist with US Department of Agriculture

J 
 Eystein Jansen (1953-), Norwegian professor of paleoceanography at University of Bergen and former director of Bjerknes Centre for Climate Research
 Phil Jones (1952-), British, instrumental climate change, palaeoclimatology, detection of climate change
 Jean Jouzel, French, glaciologist and climatologist specializing in major climatic shifts

K 
Peter Kalmus, American data scientist at NASA's Jet Propulsion Laboratory and Associate Project Scientist at University of California, Los Angeles’ Joint Institute for Regional Earth System Science & Engineering
Daniel Kammen, American professor of Energy at University of California, Berkeley
Thomas R. Karl (1951-), American, climate extremes and variability
David Karoly, Australian professor of meteorology at University of Melbourne
Charles David Keeling (1928-2005), American, atmospheric carbon dioxide measurements, Keeling Curve
Ralph Keeling (1959-), American professor of Atmospheric Chemistry at Scripps Institution of Oceanography
David W. Keith, Canadian, Geoengineering and CO2 capture and storage research, University Professor at SEAS and Harvard Kennedy School
Wilfrid George Kendrew, (1884-1962), Scottish climatologist and meteorologist
Gretchen Keppel-Aleks, American climate scientist
Joseph B. Klemp, American atmospheric scientist at NCAR
Thomas Knutson, American climate modeller, researcher at GFDL
Reto Knutti, Swiss climate scientist, professor at ETH Zurich
Kirill Y. Kondratyev (1920-2006), Russian atmospheric physicist
Bronwen Konecky, paleoclimatologist and climatologist
Pancheti Koteswaram, Indian meteorologist and former vice-president of the World Meteorological Organization
Shen Kuo (1031-1095), Chinese scientist who inferred that climates naturally shifted over an enormous span of time
M. Levent Kurnaz, Turkish climate scientist at Boğaziçi University, director of the Center for Climate Change and Policy Studies (iklimBU)
John E. Kutzbach (1937-2021), American climatologist at University of Wisconsin–Madison

L 
Dmitry Lachinov (1842-1902), Russian climatologist and engineer
Hubert Lamb (1913-1997), British climatologist, founder of the Climatic Research Unit at University of East Anglia
Kurt Lambeck, Australian, cryosphere-hydrosphere-lithosphere interactions, and sea level rise and its impact on human populations
 Helmut Landsberg (1906-1985), German-American, fostered the use of statistical analysis in climatology, which led to its evolution into a physical science
Christopher Landsea (1965-), American meteorologist, Science and Operations Officer at the National Hurricane Center
Mojib Latif (1954-), German, meteorology and oceanography, climate modelling
Corinne Le Quéré, France/Canadian/UK, Royal Society research professor, University of East Anglia
Anders Levermann, German professor of climate dynamics at University of Potsdam
Richard Lindzen (1940-), American, dynamic meteorology, especially planetary waves
Diana Liverman (1954-), American/British, climate impacts, vulnerability and policy
Michael Lockwood, British professor of physics at Reading University
Michael S. Longuet-Higgins FRS (Oceanographer) (1925-2016), British, mathematician and oceanographer DAMTP at Cambridge University and Scripps Institution UCSD, ocean waves and fluid dynamics
Edward Norton Lorenz (1917-2008), American, discovery of the strange attractor notion and coined the term butterfly effect
Claude Lorius, French glaciologist, director emeritus of CNRS
James Lovelock (1919-2022), British, Gaia hypothesis and biotic feedbacks.
Amanda Lynch, Australian Professor at Brown University bridging research between atmospheric and climate change science, and environmental policy and Indigenous knowledge
Peter Lynch, Irish meteorologist and mathematician

M 
Michael MacCracken (1942-), American, chief scientist at the Climate Institute in Washington, DC
Gordon J. F. MacDonald (1929-2002), American physicist who developed one of the first computational models of climate change, and was an early advocate for governmental action
Jerry D. Mahlman (1940-2012), American meteorologist and climatologist and a pioneer in the use of computational models of the atmosphere to examine the interactions between atmospheric chemistry and physics
László Makra (1952-), Hungarian climatologist. Full professor. His main research area is pollen climatology and, within this, analysis of climatological relationships of ragweed pollen, as well as relationship between ragweed pollen concentration and respiratory diseases. 
Syukuro Manabe (1931-), American, professor Princeton University, pioneered the use of computers to simulate global climate change and natural climate variations
Gordon Manley (1902-1980), English, Central England temperature (CET) series
Michael E. Mann (1965-), American, professor of meteorology and director, Earth System Science Center, Penn State U.
David Marshall, British physical oceanographer at the University of Oxford.
Valerie Masson-Delmotte, French climate scientist with a focus on paleoclimatology at the Climate and Environment Sciences Laboratory (LSCE)
Gordon McBean, Canadian, boundary layer research, hydrometeorology and environmental impact research, and weather forecasting
James J. McCarthy, American professor of Biological Oceanography at Harvard University
Helen McGregor, an Australian geologist and climate change researcher, a Fellow with the Research School of Earth Sciences at the Australian National University
Christopher McKay, American planetary scientist at NASA Ames Research Center
Marcia McNutt, American geophysicist, president of the National Academy of Sciences
Linda Mearns, American climate scientist, senior scientist at NCAR
Carl Mears, American, senior scientist at Remote Sensing Systems
Gerald A. Meehl (1951-), American climatologist at NCAR
Katrin Meissner, German and Australian physical oceanographer and climate scientist, director of the Climate Change Research Centre at University of New South Wales
Sebastian H. Mernild (1972-), Danish glaciologist and hydrologist, former director of the Nansen Environmental Research Center (NERSC), Bergen, Norway and research director of the Climate Change and Glaciology Laboratory (at CECs), Valdivia, Chile. Former Vice President of the International Commission on Snow and Ice Hydrology (under IAHS). 
Patrick Michaels (1950-), American climatologist
Milutin Milanković (1879-1958), Serbian, Milankovitch cycles
John F. B. Mitchell, British, climate modelling and detection and attribution of climate change
Fritz Möller (1906-1983), German, early modeling of  greenhouse effect
Mario J. Molina (1943-2020), Mexican, atmospheric chemistry and ozone depletion
Nils-Axel Mörner (1938-2020), Swedish oceanographer and climate scientist
Richard H. Moss, Chairman, Advisory Committee for the Sustained National Climate Assessment
Richard A. Muller (1944-), American physicist, head of the Berkeley Earth Surface Temperature project, formerly an outspoken critic of current climate change science
R. E. Munn FRSC (1919-2013), Canadian climatologist

N 
Gerald North (1938-), American atmospheric scientist at Texas A&M and author of the North Report

O 
 Hans Oeschger (1927-1998), Swiss paleoclimatologist and isotope chemist
 Atsumu Ohmura (1942-), Japanese climatologist, professor emeritus at ETH Zurich
 Cliff Ollier (1931-), British-Australian geologist and climate scientist
 Abraham H. Oort, Dutch-American climatologist
 Michael Oppenheimer, American professor of geosciences at Princeton University
 Timothy Osborn, British professor of Climate Science at University of East Anglia
Friederike Otto (born 1982), German climatologist, associate director of the Environmental Change Institute

P 
Tim Palmer CBE FRS (1952-), British mathematical physicist, climate modeler at Oxford University
Garth Paltridge (1940-), Australian atmospheric physicist
David E. Parker, British, surface temperature trend
Fyodor Panayev (1856-1933), Russian climatologist
Graeme Pearman OA FAAS (1941-), Australian climatologist
William Richard Peltier (1943-), Canadian, global geodynamic modeling and ice sheet reconstructions; atmospheric and oceanic waves and turbulence
Jean Robert Petit, French paleoclimatologist, emeritus director of research at Centre national de la recherche scientifique
David Phillips OC (1944-), Canadian climatologist and meteorologist
Roger A. Pielke, Sr. (1946-), American, climate change, environmental vulnerability, numerical modeling, and atmospheric dynamics
Raymond Pierrehumbert, idealized climate modeling, Faint young sun paradox
Andrew Pitman (1964-), British, terrestrial processes in global and regional climate modelling, model evaluation and earth systems approaches to understanding climate change
Gilbert Plass (1920-2004), Canadian, CO2 greenhouse effect and AGW
Henry Pollack, American emeritus professor of geophysics at University of Michigan
Vicky Pope, British, Head of the Climate Prediction Programme at the Hadley Centre for Climate Prediction and Research

Q 
Detlef Quadfasel, German professor of Geophysics at Niels Bohr Institute

R 
Stefan Rahmstorf (1960-), German, the role of ocean currents in climate change
Veerabhadran Ramanathan, Indian, general circulation models, atmospheric chemistry, and radiative transfer
Michael Raupach (1950-2015), Australian climatologist, formerly of CSIRO and was director of the Climate Change program at Australian National University
Maureen Raymo, American, paleoclimatologist
David Reay, Professor of Carbon Management at the University of Edinburgh
Martine Rebetez (1961-) is a Swiss climatologist, professor at the University of Neuchâtel and senior scientist at Swiss Federal Institute for Forest, Snow and Landscape Research WSL.
Roger Revelle (1909-1991), American, global warming and chemical oceanography
Lewis Fry Richardson (1881-1953), English mathematician and meteorologist
Eric Rignot, American professor of Earth System Science at University of California, Irvine
Alan Robock (1941-), American climatologist, professor at Rutgers University
Joeri Rogelj (1980-), Belgian climate scientist and IPCC author
Joseph J. Romm (1960-), American author, blogger, physicist
Carl-Gustaf Rossby (1898-1957), Swedish-American climatologist
Frank Sherwood Rowland (1927-2012), American atmospheric chemist at University of California, Irvine
Cynthia E. Rosenzweig (c. 1958-), American climatologist, pioneered the study of climate change and agriculture
William Ruddiman, American, palaeoclimatologist, Early Anthropogenic Hypothesis
Steve Running, American global ecologist at University of Montana

S 
 Murry Salby, American atmospheric and climate scientist
Jim Salinger, New Zealand climatologist
Dork Sahagian, Armenian-American, Lehigh University
Marie Sanderson (1921-2010), Canadian geographer and climatologist
Ben Santer (1955-), climatologist at Lawrence Livermore National Laboratory
Nicola Scafetta (1975-), Italian astronomer and climate scientist
Hans Joachim Schellnhuber (1950-), German climatologist, was an author for the Third Assessment Report of the Intergovernmental Panel on Climate Change
David Schindler, Canadian-American environmental chemist, professor of Ecology at University of Alberta
Michael Schlesinger, American professor of Atmospheric Sciences at UIUC
William H. Schlesinger (1950-), American biogeochemist, former Dean of the Nicholas School at Duke University
Gavin A. Schmidt, American climatologist and climate modeler at the NASA Goddard Institute for Space Studies (GISS)
Stephen H. Schneider (1945-2010), American, Professor of Environmental Biology and Global Change at Stanford University
Daniel P. Schrag (1966-), American, Professor of Geology at Harvard University and Director of the Harvard University Center for the Environment]
Stephen E. Schwartz (1941-), American, chemistry of air pollutants, radiative forcing of aerosols on climate
Tom Segalstad (1949-), Norwegian geochemist
Wolfgang Seiler (1940-), German climatologist at the Karlsruhe Institute of Technology
John H. Seinfeld, American atmospheric chemist at California Institute of Technology
Mark Serreze (1960-), American geographer/climatologist, director of the National Snow and Ice Data Center
Nicholas Shackleton (1937-2006), British paleoclimatologist at Cambridge University
Nir Shaviv (1972-), Israeli‐American astrophysicist and climate scientist
J. Marshall Shepherd, American professor of meteorology at University of Georgia
Drew Shindell, American atmospheric chemist, professor of Climate Sciences at Duke University
Keith Shine, Regius Professor of Meteorology and Climate Science at the University of Reading 
Jagdish Shukla (1944-), Indian-American climatologist at George Mason University
Joanne Simpson (1923-2010), American meteorologist
Fred Singer (1924-2020), atmospheric physicist, president of the Science & Environmental Policy Project 
Julia Slingo (1950-), chief scientist at the Met Office since 2009
Joseph Smagorinsky (1924-2005), American meteorologist; first head of NOAA GFDL
Susan Solomon (1956-), American, research in chlorofluorocarbons and ozone depletion
Richard C. J. Somerville (1941-), American climatologist Scripps Institution of Oceanography
Willie Soon (1966-), Malaysian-born American astrophysicist and climate scientist
Kozma Spassky-Avtonomov (1807-1890), Russian climatologist
Roy Spencer, climatologist, research scientist at the University of Alabama
Konrad Steffen (1952-2020), Swiss-American glaciologist at University of Colorado Boulder
Will Steffen (1947-2023), Australian climatologist, science advisor to Australian government
 David Stephenson (1963-), British, climate scientist and statistician at the University of Exeter. 
Thomas Stocker, Swiss, climate dynamics and paleoclimate modeling and reconstruction
Hans von Storch (1949-), German, meteorologist of Geesthacht, Germany
Peter A. Stott, British, climate scientist.
Hans E. Suess (1909-1993), Austrian, radiocarbon dating
Henrik Svensmark, Professor in the Division of Solar System Physics at the Danish National Space Institute

T 
Kevin Russel Tate (1943-2018), New Zealand soil chemist, studied carbon cycling and sequestration in soils
Simon Tett, British, detection and attribution of climate change, model initialization, and validation
Peter Thejll (1956-), Danish, Northern Hemisphere land air temperature, solar variation and greenhouse effect
Peter Thorne, British climatologist with the Nansen Environmental and Remote Sensing Centre, Bergen, Norway
Liz Thomas, British paleoclimatologist, ice cores, British Antarctic Survey
Lonnie Thompson (1948-), American, Professor of Earth Sciences, Ohio State University paleoclimatology, ice cores
Axel Timmermann, German climate physicist and oceanographer, director of IBS Center for Climate Physics
Micha Tomkiewicz (1939-), American climate change professor at Brooklyn College
Owen Toon, American professor of Atmospheric and Ocean Sciences at University of Colorado Boulder
Kevin E. Trenberth, decadal variability, El Niño-Southern Oscillation
Susan Trumbore, earth systems scientist focusing on the carbon cycle and its effects on climate, director at the Max Planck Institute for Biogeochemistry and a Professor of Earth System Science at University of California, Irvine
John Tyndall (1820-1893), British, measured radiative effect of greenhouse gases, postulated greenhouse effect hypothesis of climate change

V 
Jean-Pascal van Ypersele (1957-), Belgian climatologist, Vice-Chair of IPCC (2008-2015)
David Vaughan, ice sheets, British Antarctic Survey
Jan Veizer (1941-), Slovakian, Distinguished University Professor emeritus of Earth Sciences at the University of Ottawa 
Pier Vellinga (1950-), Dutch climatologist, professor at Wageningen University
Ricardo Villalba, Argentine paleoclimatologist
Françoise Vimeux, French climatologist, research director at the Institut de recherche pour le développement (IRD), works at the Laboratoire des sciences du climat et de l'environnement (LSCE) and the Laboratoire HydroSciences Montpellier (HSM)

W 
Peter Wadhams ScD (1948-), professor of Ocean Physics, and Head of the Polar Ocean Physics Group in the Department of Applied Mathematics and Theoretical Physics, University of Cambridge. He is best known for his work on sea ice.
Warren M. Washington (1936-), American, climate modelling
John Michael Wallace, North Atlantic oscillation, Arctic oscillation, El Niño-Southern Oscillation
Andrew Watson (1952-), British, marine and atmospheric sciences
Sir Robert Watson, British scientist and chief scientist for the World Bank
Betsy Weatherhead, American, former head of the National Climate Assessment
Andrew J. Weaver, Canadian, climate modeling and analysis.
Harry Wexler (1911-1962), American meteorologist
Penny Whetton, Australian, regional climate change projections for Australia. A lead author of the IPCC third and fourth Assessment Report on Climate Change.
Tom Wigley, Australian climatologist at University of Adelaide
Josh Willis, American oceanographer at NASA's JPL
David Wratt, New Zealander, chief scientist at NIWA
Donald Wuebbles, American atmospheric scientist and professor at the University of Illinois at Urbana–Champaign
Carl Wunsch (1941-), physical oceanography and ocean acoustic tomography

Z 
Olga Zolina (1975-), Russian climatologist
Eduardo Zorita (1961-), Spanish paleoclimatologist, senior scientist at GKSS

See also 
 List of women climate scientists and activists
 Women in climate change

climate
 
Climate scientists